Maria Olegovna Vigalova (or Vygalova; ; born 29 June 1999) is a Russian pair skater. With partner Egor Zakroev, she is the 2014 World Junior bronze medalist, a two-time JGP Final medalist (2013 silver, 2012 bronze) and the 2014 Russian national senior bronze medalist.

Personal life 
Maria Olegovna Vigalova was born 29 June 1999 in Perm, Russia.

Career 
Vigalova's first coach was Olga Amosova-Konkova. She took up pair skating in 2009 with Ivan Armeev.

Vigalova teamed up with Egor Zakroev in 2010. The two were coached by Valentina Tiukova, Valeri Tiukov, and Pavel Sliusarenko at the Figure Skating Academy in Perm. Olga Volozhinskaya visits the pair three to four times a year to work on choreography and presentation.

In the 2011–12 season, Vigalova/Zakroev finished tenth in their senior Russian Championships debut and placed fourth on the junior level.

Vigalova/Zakroev debuted on the Junior Grand Prix series in the 2012–13 season. They won the bronze medal at JGP Austria and silver at JGP Germany, qualifying them for the JGP Final in Sochi, Russia, where they won the bronze medal. At the Russian Championships, the pair finished ninth on the senior level and then fourth again on the junior level behind Kamilla Gainetdinova / Ivan Bich.

Vigalova/Zakroev's first event of the 2013–14 season was the 2013 JGP Latvia where they won the bronze medal behind teammates Evgenia Tarasova / Vladimir Morozov. They won gold for the first time at the 2013 JGP Slovakia while posting new personal best scores – 57.75 (SP), 110.35 (FS), 168.10 points (overall). Their results qualified them to the JGP Final in Fukuoka, Japan. At the final, Vigalova/Zakroev placed third in the short program and first in the free skate, winning the silver medal behind Yu Xiaoyu / Jin Yang. After the event, Zakroev underwent treatment for cysts. At the Russian Championships, the pair won bronze on the senior level and silver on the junior level. They were assigned to the 2014 World Junior Championships in Sofia, Bulgaria, where they won the bronze medal after placing fourth in the short program and third in the free skate.

In preparation for the 2014–15 season, Vigalova/Zakroev spent some time training in Sochi and Novogorsk, near Moscow, as well as their regular training site in Perm. Their first event of the season was at the 2014 JGP Estonia where they won the gold medal with a score of 161.83 points. Their next event at the 2014 JGP Croatia, they won another gold with a total of 167.98 points qualifying them to their third ISU JGP Final held in Barcelona, Spain where they took the bronze medal behind teammates Lina Fedorova / Maxim Miroshkin.

Programs 
(with Zakroev)

Competitive highlights 
CS: Challenger Series; JGP: Junior Grand Prix

With Zakroev

References

External links 

 

Russian female pair skaters
World Junior Figure Skating Championships medalists
1999 births
Living people
Sportspeople from Perm, Russia